Richard Austin may refer to:

Richard Austin (colonist) (1598–1645), came to Massachusetts colony on Bevis in 1638
Richard Austin (punchcutter) (1756–1832), British punchcutter
Richard W. Austin (1857–1919), United States Representative for Tennessee
Richard B. Austin (1901–1977), United States federal judge
Richard Austin (conductor) (1903–1989), British orchestra conductor
Richard H. Austin (1913–2001), African American politician, Secretary of State of Michigan
Richard G. Austin (weightlifter) (born c. 1929), American weightlifter
Richard Cartwright Austin (born 1934), American writer and environmental theologian
Rick Austin (baseball) (born 1946), American baseball player
Richard G. Austin (politician) (born 1948), politician from Illinois
Richard Austin (cricketer) (1954–2015), West Indian cricketer
Victor Milán (born 1954), American science fiction writer, used the pseudonym Richard Austin
Rick Austin (politician) (born 1966), Georgia State Representative